Agoard and Aglibert were martyrs at Créteil, Paris, France, around 400 AD.
Other sources say their martyrdom was in the 7th or 8th century.
Saint Agoard and Saint Aglibert are celebrated locally on 24 June.

Relics

The relics of Saint Agoard and Saint Aglibert are kept in an old metal reliquary in the crypt of the Saint-Christophe Church, Créteil.
Henry Lerolle painted a fresco in this church in 1874, that represents the martyrs.
At the beginning of the 20th century, a cross still marked the place that tradition held to be the place of martyrdom.

Usuard's account 

The hagiographic legend of "Saint Agoard" is found in the martyrology of the Benedictine monk Usuard from around 865. 
This text is questioned today by historians who qualify it as an "incoherent assemblage".
It states that Agoard resided in Créteil near Paris. 
He was massacred around the year 400 with his family and friends, including Saint Aglibert.

Ramsgate account

The monks of St Augustine's Abbey, Ramsgate wrote in their Book of Saints (1921),

Butler's account

The hagiographer Alban Butler wrote in his Lives of the Primitive Fathers, Martyrs, and Other Principal Saints (1799),

Notes

Sources

 
 

 

Saints
400 deaths